Galatasaray SK Men's 1985–1986 season is the 1985–1986 basketball season for Turkish professional basketball club Galatasaray SK.

The club competes in:
Turkish Basketball League
FIBA European Champions Cup

Depth chart

Squad changes for the 1985–1986 season

In:

Out:

Results, schedules and standings

Turkish Basketball League 1985–86

Regular season

Pts=Points, Pld=Matches played, W=Matches won, L=Matches lost, F=Points for, A=Points against
Tarsus İdmanyurdu Erkutspor withdrew from Turkish Basketball League prior to the regular season kick off. During the first half of regular season, game scores registered as 0-2 and then the team dismissed from regular season second half schedule.

1st Half

2nd Half

Playoffs

Quarter-finals

Semi-finals

Finals

President Cup

FIBA European Champions Cup

References
 Milliyet Newspaper Archive 1985-86

Galatasaray S.K. (men's basketball) seasons
Galatasaray Sports Club 1985–86 season